The 2020 Arnold Strongman Classic was a strongman contest that took place in Columbus, Ohio, from March 6–7, 2020 at the Greater Columbus Convention Center. The Arnold Strongman Classic is the finale of the Arnold Strongman Tour and is seen as one of the biggest and most prestigious strongmen events on the circuit.

Due to the COVID-19 pandemic, this year's competition was closed to general spectators with the crowd consisting of the athletes' family or team members.

Hafþór Júlíus Björnsson won the competition for the third time, becoming only the second man to win the competition three consecutive times after Žydrūnas Savickas. Mateusz Kieliszkowski finished a close 2nd, while Martins Licis secured the 3rd place.

Qualifying

To qualify for the Arnold Strongman Classic, athletes have to either win a sanctioned event on the Arnold Classic Tour or gain enough points to be invited through a wildcard system. Athletes that qualified and their method for qualification are as follows:

Event Results

Event 1: Trial by Stone
 Weight: 1 x  stone overhead press, 1 x  stone overhead press, 1 x  natural stone load, 1 x  natural stone load, 1 x  Husafell Stone carry.
 Time Limit: 60 seconds per stone.
 Course Length: 
 Notes: Stones must be attempted in ascending order. Each stone apparatus is worth a differing number of points. The order of the event will be determined by number of points, then time.

Event 2: Bag Over Bar
 Weight:  going up in  increments.
 Bar Height: 
 Time Limit: 30 seconds per throw
Athletes are allowed to skip weights.

Event 3: Wheel of Pain
 Weight:  for max distance.
 Time Limit: 60 seconds.
 Notes: Athletes are only to push using their hands and shoulders. Neck usage is not allowed.

Event 4: Elephant Bar Deadlift
 Time Limit: 60 seconds per lift
 Notes: 3 lifts per athlete. Figure-8 straps and deadlift suit are not allowed.

Event 5: Frame Carry
 Weight: 
 Course Length:  ramp
 Time Limit: 30 seconds
 Notes: No straps are allowed. Fastest time wins, then distance.

Event 6: Strategic Cyr Dumbbell Challenge
 Weight: 
 Time Limit: 90 seconds 

Final standings

References

Arnold Strongman Classic
Arnold Strongman Classic
Arnold Strongman Classic
Strongmen competitions